Flying dragons is the common name of gliding lizards in the genus Draco, particularly the species Draco volans.

It may also refer to:

Entertainment 
 Flying Dragon series of video games created by Culture Brain known as Hiryu no Ken in Japan
 Flying Dragon: The Secret Scroll, the first game in the series
 Flying Dragon (Calder), an Alexander Calder sculpture at the Art Institute of Chicago
 "The Flying Dragon", 1966 season 2 episode from Mystery and Imagination

Biology 
 A cultivar of Trifoliate orange
 Draco (lizard) a genus of lizards
 Xianglong, a gliding lizard of the Cretaceous period

Geography 
 Thang Long, the old name of Hanoi, Vietnam

Other uses 
 Flying Dragons (gang), a Chinese-American organized crime group
 A trademark of Yomeishu that is said to be the first trademark in Japan in 1603. The trademark was given by the shōgun Ieyasu Tokugawa.
 SAC-46 Flying Dragon, handgun, USA

See also
Hiryu (disambiguation)
Magic dragon